Copelatus brancuccii is a species of diving beetle. It is part of the genus Copelatus in the subfamily Copelatinae of the family Dytiscidae. It was described by Roucchi in 1979.

References

brancuccii
Beetles described in 1979